"Life Is a Flower" is a 1998 song by Swedish group Ace of Base, released as the first single from their third album, Flowers (1998). The song was released in the US with different lyrics, titled "Whenever You're Near Me", and in a different key. It peaked at number-one in Hungary and was a top-ten hit in Denmark, Finland, Scotland, Spain, Sweden and the UK. "Life Is a Flower" was certified silver in the UK by the BPI. Jonas Berggren, writer of "Life Is a Flower", in a 2015 interview described it as is his greatest Ace of Base song.

Critical reception
AllMusic editor Bryan Buss described the song as acoustic in his review. A reviewer from Evening Herald called it a gem, adding that "more of the same can often be a good thing". Swedish newspaper Expressen noted it as a "safe card". Göteborgsposten wrote that it is "almost religiously positive". Pan-European magazine Music & Media commented that "although the sound and style on the latest single remains unmistakably that of Ace Of Base, the Swedish outfit have still been able to reinvent themselves enough to stay relevant and keep pace with dance scene developments." Bernhard Hiller, head of music at AC/CHR outlet 104.6 RTL/Berlin said, "It is a great comeback for them. The good thing is that they have managed to change their sound while still sounding like Ace of Base." He added, "Of course, this record is an absolute blessing for radio; we added it as soon as it got in, and currently we are playing it 15–20 times a week. At first audience response was less than overwhelming-but then again it is still early days; and besides, how can an audience like records when you don't allow the listeners to get to know the tracks?"

Chart performance
"Life Is a Flower" was a major hit on the charts in Europe, peaking at number-one in Hungary. Additionally, it managed to reach the Top 10 also in Denmark, Finland, Scotland, Spain, Sweden and the United Kingdom. In the latter, the single went straight to number five in its first week at the UK Singles Chart, on 19 July 1998. It was also a Top 20 hit in Austria, France, Germany, Ireland, Italy, Norway and Switzerland, as well as on the Eurochart Hot 100, where it hit number 19 in August 1998. In Iceland and the Netherlands, "Life Is a Flower" went into the Top 30. Outside Europe, it was a hit in New Zealand, where it peaked at number 29. It earned a gold record in the band's native Sweden, with a sale of 15,000 singles and a silver record in the UK, after 200,000 units were sold there.

Music video

Two music videos for "Life Is a Flower" were shot, but the first was unfinished and has never been released. Part of the storyboard for the second video, which became the official release, was created by Jenny Berggren herself. Ace of Base also brought some elements of scenography of their own, including a washing machine. The video was uploaded to YouTube in January 2015. As of December 2022, it has had more than 7.9 million views on the platform.

Track listings

 Scandinavian maxi-CD single
 "Life Is a Flower" (original version) — 3:45
 "Life Is a Flower" (reggae version) — 3:32
 "Life Is a Flower" (extended version) — 5:44
 "Life Is a Flower" (Soul Poets night club mix) — 5:19
 "No Good Lover" — 3:53

 European CD single
 "Life Is a Flower" (original version) — 3:45
 "Life Is a Flower" (extended version) — 5:49

 UK CD1
 "Life Is a Flower" (original version)
 "Life Is a Flower" (extended version)
 "Life Is a Flower" (Soul Poets' night club mix)
 "Life Is a Flower" (Milk Inc. long edit)

 UK CD2
 "Life Is a Flower"
 "The Sign" (radio edit)
 "All That She Wants"

Charts and certifications

Weekly charts

Year-end charts

Sales and certifications

Release history

References

1998 singles
1998 songs
Ace of Base songs
London Records singles
Mega Records singles
Number-one singles in Hungary
Polydor Records singles
Songs written by Jonas Berggren